The 2014 China Open will be the eleventh super series tournament of the 2014 BWF Super Series. The tournament will be contested in Fuzhou, China from November 11–16, 2014 with a total purse of $700,000. A qualification will occur to fill four places in all five disciplines of the main draws. For the first time in the history of this super series tournament, two non-Chinese players won men's and women's singles titles both from India.

Players by nation

Representatives by nation

Men's singles

Seeds 

  Chen Long
  Jan Ø. Jørgensen
  Kenichi Tago
  Tommy Sugiarto
  Shon Wan-ho
  Wang Zhengming
  Hu Yun
  Tian Houwei

Top half

Bottom half

Finals

Women's singles

Seeds 

  Li Xuerui
  Wang Shixian
  Wang Yihan
  Sung Ji-hyun
  Bae Yeon-ju
  Saina Nehwal
  Ratchanok Intanon
  Tai Tzu-ying

Top half

Bottom half

Finals

Men's doubles

Seeds 

  Lee Yong-dae / Yoo Yeon-seong
  Muhammad Ahsan / Hendra Setiawan
  Mathias Boe / Carsten Mogensen
  Hiroyuki Endo / Kenichi Hayakawa
  Ko Sung-hyun / Shin Baek-cheol
  Lee Sheng-mu / Tsai Chia-hsin
  Liu Xiaolong / Qiu Zihan
  Chai Biao / Hong Wei

Top half

Bottom half

Finals

Women's doubles

Seeds 

  Bao Yixin / Tang Jinhua
  Tian Qing / Zhao Yunlei
  Misaki Matsutomo / Ayaka Takahashi
  Christinna Pedersen / Kamilla Rytter Juhl
  Wang Xiaoli / Yu Yang
  Reika Kakiiwa / Miyuki Maeda
  Luo Ying / Luo Yu
  Nitya Krishinda Maheswari / Greysia Polii

Top half

Bottom half

Finals

Mixed doubles

Seeds 

  Zhang Nan / Zhao Yunlei
  Xu Chen / Ma Jin
  Joachim Fischer Nielsen / Christinna Pedersen
  Tontowi Ahmad / Lilyana Natsir
  Chris Adcock / Gabrielle Adcock
  Ko Sung-hyun / Kim Ha-na
  Sudket Prapakamol / Saralee Thoungthongkam
  Liu Cheng / Bao Yixin

Top half

Bottom half

Finals

References 

China Open
China Open
Sport in Fuzhou
China Open (badminton)